Chenar Bow (also Romanized as Chenār Bow; also known as Chenār Bowy and Chehār Bū) is a village in Qalandarabad Rural District, Qalandarabad District, Fariman County, Razavi Khorasan Province, Iran. At the 2006 census, its population was 112, in 24 families.

References 

Populated places in Fariman County